The 2010–11 Ekstraklasa was the 77th season of the highest level of football leagues in Poland since its establishment in 1927. It began on 6 August 2010 and concluded on 29 May 2011. A total of 16 teams participated, 14 of which competed in the league during the 2009–10 season, while the remaining two were promoted from the I Liga. Each team played a total of 30 matches, half at home and half away.

Wisła Kraków won the title, which marked their 13th title in total.

Wisła Kraków qualified as champions for the 2nd qualifying round of the 2011–12 UEFA Champions League, while Śląsk Wrocław, as the runner-up, entered the 2nd qualifying round of the 2011–12 UEFA Europa League, followed by the fourth placed Jagiellonia Białystok team that earned a place in the 1st qualifying round of the Europa League. Legia Warsaw, the winner of the 2010–11 Polish Cup, also earned a place in European competition by qualifying to the 3rd qualifying round of the Europa League.

The defending champions were Lech Poznań, who won their sixth Polish championship last season.

Teams 
Promotion and relegation was established by a change, which eliminated relegation play-off games after the 2008–09 season. Thus, the 14th team from the Ekstraklasa and the 3rd team from the Polish First League no longer competed against each other in play-offs. Following the change, promotion and relegation were determined solely by a team's position in the table. As usual, the bottom two teams were directly relegated to the I Liga, while the top two teams were promoted to the Ekstraklasa.

Odra Wodzisław and Piast Gliwice finished in 15th and 16th place, respectively, and were directly relegated to the Polish First League as a result. Odra Wodzisław returned to the second tier after spending 14 years in the top division, their first appearance being in the 1996–97 season. Piast Gliwice spent just two seasons in the Ekstraklasa, after being promoted for the first time for the 2008–09 season, having spent the previous 71 seasons in the lower leagues.

Promotion was won by 2009–10 2nd level champions Widzew Łódź, who returned to the top division after being relegated in the 2007–08 season. 14-time Ekstraklasa champions Górnik Zabrze finished as runners-up in the I Liga and made their comeback to the top tier after being relegated in the 2008–09 season.

Stadiums and locations 
Since and prior to the selection of Poland as co-host for Euro 2012, numerous clubs were engaged in reconstruction of their stadiums, or building a completely new stadium. Some teams in the beginning of the season played their home matches in other stadiums. For instance Wisła Kraków played their home matches at the Hutnik Kraków stadium, the Stadion Suche Stawy, which held 12,000 spectators. However, the move to the nearly completed 33,000-plus home stadium was in effect mid-season. Legia Warsaw and Lech Poznań played at stadiums which remained under construction but nearing completion. Dialog Arena, the home venue of Zagłębie Lubin was the newest completely finished stadium in the Ekstraklasa these season, being completed just before the start of the season.

Arka Gdynia, and Cracovia started the season playing in their old stadiums. The two clubs moved to their completely finished new stadiums mid season. Jagiellonia Białystok, Lechia Gdańsk, and Śląsk Wrocław played in their old stadiums while their new venues were being constructed. The 40,000 plus PGE Arena Gdańsk became the new home ground for Lechia after its completion in 2011, while Śląsk moved to the new 45,000 plus Stadion Wrocław. The two stadiums were venues for Euro 2012.

Sponsoring and personnel 

Puma continues as Ekstraklasa's official match ball suppliers through the 2010–11 season. All matches are played with the PUMA PowerCat 1.10 ultra balls, which is a special model created just for the Ekstraklasa.

The official presentation of the new ball for Ekstraklasa was prepared together with PUMA Poland in the beginning of August 2010 – just before the start of season. The case of prolonging the use of the match ball for the next two seasons was made official on 3 August 2010. The new model will be used through the 2011–12 season as it is regarded at the highest quality .

Managerial changes

League table

Results

Player statistics

Top goalscorers

Top assistants

Player of the month

See also 
 2010–11 Polish Cup
 2010–11 I Liga

References

External links 
 Official site

Ekstraklasa seasons
Poland
1